Tretyakovo is a rural locality (a station) and the administrative center of Tretyakovsky Selsoviet, Tretyakovsky District, Altai Krai, Russia. The population was 796 as of 2013. There are 17 streets.

Geography 
It is located 18 km south from Staroaleyskoye.

References 

Rural localities in Tretyakovsky District